A power source is a source of power. Most commonly the type of power referred to is:
 Power (physics), the rate of doing work; equivalent to an amount of energy consumed per unit time
 Electric power, the rate at which electrical energy is transferred by an electric circuit; usually produced by electric generators or batteries

Power source may correspondingly refer to:
 A source of primary energy, an energy form found in nature that has not been subjected to any conversion or transformation process
 Energy carrier, or secondary energy, a substance or phenomenon that contains energy that can be later converted to other forms such as mechanical work or heat or to operate chemical or physical processes
 Fuel, a material that stores potential energy in forms that can be practicably released and used for work
 See Energy development for an overview of primary and secondary energy or power sources

or, often more specifically to an electric power source:
The electric power industry
 A source of electrical energy
 Electric power system, a network of electrical components used to supply, transmit and use electric power
 Electricity generation, the process of generating electric power from other sources of primary energy
 Power station, an industrial facility for the generation of electric power
 Electric generator, a device that converts mechanical energy to electrical energy for use in an external circuit
 Electric power transmission
 Electric power distribution
 Mains electricity or household power, the general-purpose alternating-current (AC) electric power supply
 AC power plugs and sockets, devices that allow electrically operated equipment to be connected to the primary alternating current (AC) power supply in a building
 Battery (electricity), a device consisting of one or more electrochemical cells that convert stored chemical energy into electrical energy

Some conversion devices are sometimes called a "power source":
 Engine, a machine designed to convert energy into useful mechanical motion
 Power supply, an electrical device that supplies electric energy to an electrical load, by converting one form of electrical energy to another

As a proper name
PowerSource may also refer to:
 PowerSource (phone brand), mobile phone that can make use of both Sprint-Nextel cellular networks
 PowerSource (musical group), a Christian music group of the 1980s
 PowerSource, a weekly print section, and a companion website of the Pittsburgh Post-Gazette, highlighting the Pittsburgh region’s diverse energy industry

See also

 Power (disambiguation)
 Prime mover (disambiguation)
 Source (disambiguation)
 Current source
 Voltage source